Peter William O'Malley (24 March 1927 – 9 October 1957) was a New Zealand cricketer. He played in seventeen first-class matches for Canterbury from 1947 to 1955.

See also
 List of Canterbury representative cricketers

References

External links
 

1927 births
1957 deaths
New Zealand cricketers
Canterbury cricketers
Cricketers from Christchurch